Hannah Elizabeth Brewer (born 16 April 1993) is a soccer player who last played for Newcastle Jets in the Australian W-League.

Playing career

Club career
In 2008, Brewer was a member of the Newcastle Jets team in the inaugural Australian W-League season. At the age of 15, she was the youngest member of the Jets team.

In April 2013, Brewer was signed to Seattle Sounders Women for the 2013 USL W-League season, eventually playing seven matches.

In 2014, Brewer moved to Melbourne to play for Melbourne Victory.

She sat out most of the 2015–16 W-League for family reasons, with just a single appearance for Melbourne City.

Brewer returned to regular football with Canberra United in 2016, playing 13 times in the W-League.

On 5 October 2017, Brewer returned to Newcastle Jets.

International career
Brewer made her international debut for Australia against Scotland at the 2014 Cyprus Women's Cup. She was called up again ahead of the 2018 Algarve Cup, where she played two matches.

External links
 Newcastle Jets Profile

References 

1993 births
Living people
Australian women's soccer players
Newcastle Jets FC (A-League Women) players
Seattle Sounders Women players
Melbourne Victory FC (A-League Women) players
Melbourne City FC (A-League Women) players
Canberra United FC players
A-League Women players
Women's association football defenders
People from Gosford
Sportswomen from New South Wales
Soccer players from New South Wales